Yuri Aleksandrovich Kolovorotny (born 18 May 1984) is a former Russian professional football player.

Club career
He played in the Russian Football National League for FC Amur Blagoveshchensk in 2005.

External links
 
 

1984 births
Living people
Russian footballers
Association football defenders
FC Moscow players
FC Dynamo Vologda players
FC Znamya Truda Orekhovo-Zuyevo players
FC Amur Blagoveshchensk players